Jonas Kullhammar (2 September 1978 in Nacka, Sweden) is a Swedish jazz composer, saxophonist and is one of Sweden's most established jazz musicians.

Career 
Since 1998 his main group has been Jonas Kullhammar Quartet, and he has participated on over 150 records as a sideman.
In year 2000 he released his debut recording, the self-produced "Salut". It won him Sweden Radio's Jazz Cat award as the newcomer of the year. He also received the Django D'or award and received the price Sweden Radio's Jazz Cat as Jazz Musician of The Year in Sweden two years in a row. The group also received the award for jazz group of the year. Since then the band has toured around the world and released more CDs.
Jonas is also a founding member of the groups Kullrusk and Nacka Forum.
Since 2000 he runs the record label Moserobie, that releases mainly Swedish and Norwegian jazz groups.

Kullhammar has worked with artists and bands The (International) Noise Conspiracy, Carlos Garnett, Nicolai Dunger, Fredrik Norén Band, The Torbjörn Zetterberg Hot Five, Sonic Mechatronik Arkestra, Peanuts Hucko, The Plan, Nina Ramsby, Goran Kajfes, Marcus Strickland, Eldkvarn, Jupiter Trio, The Core, Mulatu Astatke, Salem Al Fakir, The Hives, Ted Curson, Chick Corea, Jason Moran, Dungen, Rickie Lee Jones and many more.

Honors 
2000: Stallbröderna award
2001: Aftonbladets "Jazz musician of the year"
2004: Django d'Or award (Contemporary star of jazz)
2006: Arne Domnérus Guldsaxen Award
2008: Alice Babs Award
200: Svenska Jazzriksförbundets "Kjell-Ake Svensson" Award
200: Sigma award, co:Ellington society
200: Sandrew "Tore Browaldh" award
2014: Royal music academy "Jazz award"
2014: Guldbaggen award (Swedish equivalent to an Oscar) for best film music, for the film Gentlemen
2016: Lars Gullin-award
2017: Jan Johansson-award

Swedish jazz critics "Jazzkatten" awards 
2000: Newcomer of the year
2002: Jazz Artist of The Year
2002: Jazz Group Of The Year (Jonas Kullhammar Quartet)
2003: Jazz Artist of The Year

Nominations for the Swedish grammy
2002: with Nacka Forum
2003: with JKQ for Plays Loud for The People
2004: with Kullrusk
2005: with JKQ & NBB - Snake City North
2006: with JKQ - Son of a Drummer
2009: with JKQ - The Half Naked Truth
2013: with JKQ - Låt det vara
2014: for "Gentlemen - original motion picture jazz tracks"

Nominations for the manifest award
2006: with JKQ - Son of a Drummer
2009: with JKQ - The Half Naked Truth

Selected discography

Solo albums 
With Jonas Kullhammar Quartet
2000: Salut (Moserobie Music Production)
2001: The Soul Of Jonas Kullhammar (Moserobie Music Production)
2003: Plays Loud For The People (Moserobie Music Production)
2005: Snake City North (Moserobie Music Production), with Norrbotten Big Band
2006: Son Of A Drummer (Moserobie Music Production)
2009: The Half Naked Truth (Moserobie Music Production) (limited edition 8 cd box)
2010: Från Och Med Herr Jonas Kullhammar (Moserobie Music Production)
2013: Låt Det Vara (Moserobie Music Production)
2013: Plays A Love Supreme EP (Moserobie Music Production) (limited edition 10" LP)
2013: This Is The End (Moserobie Music Production) (limited edition 8 yellow 180g vinyl)

Original motion picture jazz tracks
2014: Gentlemen (Moserobie Music Production)

Collaborations 
With Jansson/Kullhammar/Nilssen-Love
2002: Live At Glenn Miller Vol.1 (Ayler Records)

With Nacka Forum
2002: Nacka Forum (Moserobie Music Production)
2005: Leve Nacka Forum (Moserobie Music Production)
2012: Fee Fi Fo Rum (Moserobie Music Production)
2014: Live In Tokyo (Moserobie Music Production), featuring Akira Sakata

With Kullrusk duo with Per "Ruskträsk" Johansson
2004: Kullrusk (Moserobie Music Production)
2006: Spring Spring Spring Spring Spring (Moserobie Music Production)
2008: Digital (Moserobie Music Production)

With Fredriksson, Kullhammar & Zetterberg
2005: Gyldene Tider Vol.1 (Moserobie Music Production)
2005: Gyldene Tider Vol.2 (Moserobie Music Production)
2005: Gyldene Tider Vol.3 (Moserobie Music Production)

With Jupiter Trio including with Håvard Stubø, Magnus Forsberg, Steinar Nickelsen featuring Jonas Kullhammar
2006: Live At Glenn Miller Café (AIM Records)
2007: III2 (Bolage Records)

With Kullhammar-Osgood-Vågan
2007: Andratx (Moserobie Music Production)
2009: Andratx Live (Moserobie Music Production)

With Pinton/Kullhammar/Zetterberg/Nordeson	
2009: Chant (Clean Feed)

With Nicolai Dunger
2010: The Original Motion Picture Soundtrack: Vallmo (Moserobie Music Production)

With Fredrik Kronkvist Sextet including Martin Sjöstedt, Petter Eldh, Raynald Colom and Snorre Kirk	
2011: Improvised Action (Connective Records)

With Fiske/Kullhammar/Zetterberg/Holmegard
2012: Svenska Kaputt (Moserobie Music Production)

With Kulhammar/Aalberg/Zetterberg
2012: Basement Sessions Vol. 1 (Clean Feed)
2013: Basement Sessions Vol. 2 (Clean Feed)

With Kullhammar, Mathisen, Zetterberg, Aalberg
2014: Basement Sessions Vol. 3 - The Ljublana Tapes (Clean Feed)

With Hegge
2017: Vi är ledsna men du får inte längre vara barn (Particular Recordings Collective)

References

External links 
 
  My Space Homepage
  Moserobie Record label
  Facebook fan page

1978 births
Living people
Swedish composers
Swedish male composers
Swedish jazz musicians
Swedish jazz saxophonists
Male saxophonists
20th-century saxophonists
21st-century saxophonists
Best Original Score Guldbagge Award winners
Male film score composers
20th-century Swedish male musicians
20th-century Swedish musicians
21st-century Swedish male musicians
Male jazz musicians